Pyletown may refer to:

Pyletown, Missouri, an unincorporated community
Pyletown, Virginia, an unincorporated community